This is a list of the officially designated symbols of the U.S. state of New Mexico. Most such designations are found in §12.3 of the New Mexico Statutes. The majority of the items in the list are officially recognized after a law is passed by the state legislature. New Mexico is the first state to adopt a state question: "Red or green?", referring to chile peppers. The state also has a proscribed answer: "Red and green or Christmas", encouraging the use of both colors of pepper, however natives of the state do not like this as Christmas chile is only popular with non-nuevomexicanos who move to New Mexico from out of state.

Insignia 

 Flag: Flag of New Mexico
 Seal: Seal of New Mexico
 Motto: Crescit eundo, It Grows as it Goes (Latin).
 Slogan: "Everybody is somebody in New Mexico" (1975)
 Question: "Red or Green?" – see New Mexico state question
 Answer: "Red and Green" or "Christmas".

Capital
 Capital: Santa Fe

Music 

 Song: O Fair New Mexico, 
 Spanish song: , Such is New Mexico
 Bilingual song: Spanish: New Mexico-Mi Lindo Nuevo México, New Mexico-My Lovely New Mexico
 Cowboy song: Under New Mexico Skies
 March: none official
 Unofficial: The New Mexico March by John Philip Sousa
 Unofficial: O Fair New Mexico (arranged as a march by Sousa)

Flora
 Flower: Yucca flower 
 Tree: Two-needle piñon pine (Pinus edulis)
 Grass: Blue grama (Bouteloua gracillis)

Foods
 Cookie: Biscochito
 Vegetables: frijoles (pinto beans) and Chile

Fauna
 Amphibian: New Mexico spadefoot toad (Spea multiplicata)
 Animal: New Mexico black bear
 Bird: Chaparral bird (greater roadrunner)
 Butterfly: Sandia hairstreak
 Fish: Rio Grande cutthroat trout
 Insect: Tarantula hawk wasp (Pepsis grossa)
 Reptile: New Mexico whiptail lizard (Cnemidophorus neomexicanus)

Geology
 Fossil: Coelophysis
 Gem: Turquoise

Other 

A 2023 proposal by state senator Bill Soules would codify the smell of roasted chiles as the state aroma.

Notes

Further reading

 (PDF)

References

State symbols
New Mexico